Webber-Camden is a neighborhood in the Camden community of Minneapolis. Its boundaries are Penn and Newton avenues to the west, the Canadian Pacific Railway tracks to the north, Interstate 94 to the east, and Dowling Avenue to the south. The neighborhood was just known as "Camden" until 1995, when the city added "Webber" to the name. Webber Park and Webber Parkway are located in the neighborhood.

References

External links

Minneapolis Neighborhood Profile - Webber-Camden
Webber-Camden Neighborhood Organization
Northwest Minneapolis Business Association

Neighborhoods in Minneapolis